Lost Cove may refer to

 Lost Cove, North Carolina, a ghost town in North Carolina
 Lost Cove, Tennessee, a valley in southern Tennessee
 Lost Cove Cave